The Yunnan gecko (Gekko scabridus) is a species of gecko. It is endemic to China. It is sometimes considered conspecific with Gray's Chinese gecko.

References

Gekko
Reptiles described in 1982
Reptiles of China
Endemic fauna of China